This List of airports in the United States Minor Outlying Islands  of Oceania is listed alphabetically. For a list sorted by ICAO Code, see List of airports by ICAO code: P.

Notes

References 

Minor islands
 
Air